This is an incomplete list of trucks currently in production and discontinued trucks (as of 2014). This list doesn't include pickup trucks, nor trucks used only in militaries. Some images provided below may show the outdated model.


Currently in production

Discontinued

Ian O’Brien

See also 
 Truck
 List of Low Cab Forward trucks
 List of pickup trucks
 List of military trucks